The EP10 (ЭП10) is a type of dual voltage six axle electric locomotive built for Russian railways RŽD by NEVZ in association with Adtranz/Bombardier for passenger use. The design was considered costly, and only 12 units were acquired.

History
Prior to the collapse of the Eastern Bloc and the breakup of the Soviet Union, passenger locomotives used in Russia had been sourced from Czechoslovakia. Afterwards these sources were considered too expensive and the Russian state sought to develop indigenous production of passenger rolling stock.

Resolution number 1400 (23 November 1996) of the Russian Federation "Разработка и производство пассажирского подвижного состава нового поколения на предприятиях России" (design and manufacture of new generation passenger rolling stock) allocated funding from the state to develop and manufacture passenger rail vehicles, including the development of a type ЭП10, specified as a six axle, dual voltage locomotive, of 6.6MW power with asynchronous traction motors and regenerative and rheostatic braking, and an operating speed of 120 to 160 km/h. The machine was to be designed by АООТ "ВЭлНИИ" (VELNII) and АООТ НПО "НЭВЗ" (NEVZ), in association with a foreign company, and manufactured by VELNII with an expected schedule of prototype delivery in 1997 and series production in 1999.

The prototype was unveiled at Novocherkassk Electric Locomotive Plant (NEVZ) on 20 November 1998.

Initially it was expected that DC and AC only versions ЭП2 (EP2) and ЭП3 (EP3) would be developed based on the asynchronous traction technology introduced in the EP10.

Certification testing was complete in February 2005. An order for 11 locomotives was placed in 2005 with Transmashholding and Bombardier Transportation; locomotives No.2 & 3 began production in 2005. The order was valued at 450 million rubles; RZD initially refused to place an order for the type, citing the high unit price.

In 2006 RZD chief engineer Valentin Gapanovich stated that only 12 of the class would be procured, and described it as a не слишком перспективный локомотив (English: not very promising), though the railway had increased it requirement for dual system locomotives. Instead he announced that Transmashholding would be seeking a foreign company to create a joint venture to manufacture a new design - the ЭП20 (EP20), with an expected order of 230 units or more.

Design
The mechanical design (body, bogies.) of the prototype locomotive was by VELNII and NEVZ, and based on the VL65 locomotive type, the electrical part (semiconductor converters, control system, transformer.) was based on designs owned by Adtranz, including the 460 series and DB Class 145. The locomotives operate from both 3 kV DC and 25 kV 50 Hz AC using asynchronous motors for traction. Main design features included frame supported traction motors, supply conversion using a four-quadrant rectifier, with intermediate DC link to a GTO based inverter, and microprocessor based control and diagnostic equipment.

The locomotives use water (60% ethylene glycol.) cooled MITRAC TC3100 type inverters,) rated at 2500 kW. Each converter supplies two parallel connected traction motors; The traction motors are three phase induction designs with two sets of 'half' windings for each phase: an individual traction unit includes 8 four-quadrant converters (4QC), and two asynchronous motors. Under DC supply (3 kV, up to 4 kV peak) two three-phase inverter blocks are connected in series; each inverter block supplies one set of 'half' windings on two parallel connected motors. When under 25 kV AC the high voltage supply is stepped down to 2.8 kV, and rectified by four-quadrant converters to an intermediate DC link, which supplies an inverter block powering two parallel connected motors, with the 'half' windings connected in series.

The design has an efficiency of up to 86% on AC supply, 88% on DC supply.

Operations
The locomotives were used (2006) on Moscow-Minsk-Brest, Moscow-St. Petersburg-Vainikkala (service to Helsinki, Finland.), and on trains from Moscow to Nizhny-Novgorod and Rostov-on-Don, the locomotives were also used on trains from Moscow to Kazan (2006).

EP10 locomotives have also been used to provide the direct night service Столичний експрес (English: 'Capitals Express') between Moscow and Kyiv.

See also
 History of rail transport in Russia

References

Sources

External links

 Profile and photos on Trainspo

Electric locomotives of Russia
Bombardier Transportation locomotives
Bo-Bo-Bo locomotives
Bo′Bo′Bo′ locomotives
5 ft gauge locomotives